Brian Germond was the  Bishop of Johannesburg from 2000 to 2013.

Since then, he has been at St Martin's in the Veld, Johannesburg.

His sister in law is the Bishop of Algoma.

Notes

21st-century Anglican Church of Southern Africa bishops
Anglican bishops of Johannesburg
Living people
Year of birth missing (living people)